Saint-Loup-du-Dorat is a commune in the Mayenne department in north-western France.

Geography
The Vaige forms most of the commune's north-eastern border.

See also
Communes of the Mayenne department

References

Saintloupdudorat